"Get to Know Ya" is a song by American R&B singer Maxwell, released in 2001. It is the lead single from his third album  Now, and peaked to No. 25 on Billboard's R&B songs chart.

Charts

Weekly charts

Year-end charts

References

External links
 www.musze.com

2001 singles
Maxwell (musician) songs
Songs written by Stuart Matthewman
2001 songs
Columbia Records singles
Songs written by Maxwell (musician)